Elektrosignal Plant is a company based in Novosibirsk, Russia.

The Elektrosignal plant was moved to its current location during World War II. A producer of radio equipment for the military, it was also producing "Izumrud" television sets for the civil economy by 1966. The plant currently continues to produce television sets and also makes aircraft radio communications equipment.

References

External links
 Official website

Electronics companies of Russia
Manufacturing companies based in Novosibirsk
Oktyabrsky District, Novosibirsk
Electronics companies of the Soviet Union
Defence companies of the Soviet Union
Ministry of Radio Industry (Soviet Union)